Bayford is a village and civil parish in the East Hertfordshire district of Hertfordshire, England.  According to the 2001 census it had a population of 435, increasing to 466 at the 2011 Census.  The village is about three miles south of Hertford, and is served by Bayford railway station.

Bayford has won 'best kept village' awards in previous years.

Bayford has a primary school: Bayford (C of E) VC Primary School.

The Parish Church of St Mary stands about a quarter of a mile north of the village; the present building dates from 1870. It was rebuilt close to the site of the old church, which was first mentioned in 1222. A 15th-century font and some 16th- and 17th-century monuments to the Knighton family have been preserved. The ornithologist William Yarrell, admired by his contemporaries for his precise scientific work, is buried in the churchyard.

Every two years the village holds a Gardens Open Day in which many of the houses open up their gardens to the public.

The manor of Bayford was purchased in 1757 by Mam Molly Crone (1705–1770), who built the mansion of Bayfordbury in 1758. She died at Bath, whilst taking the cure, and is commemorated in the Abbey. The mansion was extended by infilling between the service blocks, to house the Kit-Cat Club portraits, which Baker inherited from Jacob Tonson. In 1941 Bayfordbury was leased to Dr Barnardo's Homes for young boys aged 9 to 14 years of age. In 1945 the John Innes Institute moved to Bayfordbury and built glass houses, the research block and the houses at Broad Green Wood for their staff. The estate was later acquired by Hertfordshire County Council and occupied by Hatfield Polytechnic (later the University of Hertfordshire). They built Bayfordbury Observatory which is regarded as one of the finest teaching observatories in the country and used the research block for chemical and biological research. The mansion and stables have now been converted into residences. The research block is still used by the University and the grounds as a Regional Science Learning Centre and Environmental Science field study centre.

See also 

 Bayfordbury

References

External links 

 Bayford Parish Council Web Site
 The Clinton Baker Pinetum
 Bayford Gardens Open Day
 Bayford Action Group
 Baker of Bayfordbury
 John Innes
 Bayford Church

Villages in Hertfordshire
Civil parishes in Hertfordshire
East Hertfordshire District